The 2016 Big Ten softball tournament was held at Beard Field on the campus of Penn State University in State College, Pennsylvania from May 12 through May 14, 2016. As the tournament winner, Minnesota earned the Big Ten Conference's automatic bid to the 2016 NCAA Division I softball tournament. All tournament games aired on BTN.

Tournament

All times listed are Eastern Daylight Time.

Only the top 12 participate in the tournament, therefore Maryland and Iowa were not eligible to play.

Announcers
 Lisa Byington & Carol Bruggeman (Early- Thurs, Fri & All Sat)
 Dean Linke & Jennie Ritter (Late- Thurs, Fri)

References

2016 Big Ten Conference softball season
Big Ten Tournament
Big Ten softball tournament